"Titliaan" is a Punjabi song released in 2020, with lyrics by Jaani and music by Avvy Sra, sung by Afsana Khan. The video, featuring Harrdy Sandhu and Sargun Mehta, was directed by Arvindr Khaira. The Song become blockbuster in 2020.

Reception
The song reached number 15 on Billboard's Top Triller Global Chart in January 2021.

Titliaan Warga

Another version of the song, Titliaan Warga, was released on 6 January 2021. The lyrics were again written by Jaani, and it was sung by Harrdy Sandhu.

References

Punjabi-language songs